Methodist Episcopal Church of Butler is a historic former Methodist Episcopal church located at Butler Center in Wayne County, New York.  It is a rectangular, gable roofed frame building designed in a vernacular Greek Revival style and built about 1836.   It rests on a cobblestone foundation and is surmounted by an open belfry.  Also on the property is a cemetery (non-contributing), established in 1864.

The building was listed on the National Register of Historic Places in 1997.

Butler Church Museum
The building is now operated as the Butler Church Museum by the Butler Historical Society. It is open on the first Saturday of the month from May through October.

The Society also operates the Roe Cobblestone Schoolhouse as a museum.

References

External links

Butler Historical Society

Churches on the National Register of Historic Places in New York (state)
Churches completed in 1836
19th-century Methodist church buildings in the United States
Churches in Wayne County, New York
Museums in Wayne County, New York
History museums in New York (state)
National Register of Historic Places in Wayne County, New York
Methodist Episcopal churches in the United States